Wang Yinzhi (1766–1834) a Qing dynasty philologist. The son of Wang Niansun, he was the author of the Jingzhuan Shici.

References 

 

Linguists from China
Qing dynasty classicists
1766 births
1834 deaths